The ambassador of the United Kingdom to Paraguay is the United Kingdom's foremost diplomatic representative to the Republic of Paraguay, and head of the UK's diplomatic mission in Asunción. 

1842/43 George John Robert Gordon served as British envoy to Paraguay. Before 1941 the UK minister or ambassador to Argentina was also accredited  to Paraguay. For ambassadors (etc.) before 1941, see List of ambassadors of the United Kingdom to Argentina. The British Embassy in Argentina again covered Paraguay remotely from 2005 to 2013.

Heads of mission

Minister Resident
1941–1943: Daniel Brickell

Envoy Extraordinary and Minister Plenipotentiary
1943–1944: Daniel Brickell
1944–1945: Nigel Steward
1945–1949: John Fell
1949–1952: Ian Henderson

Ambassador Extraordinary and Plenipotentiary
1952–1953: Ian Henderson
1953–1957: Joseph Robinson
1957–1959: John Wall
1959–1962: Horace Gates
1962–1968: Sir Leonard Scopes
1968–1972: Brian MacDermot
1972–1975: Henry Bartlett
1976–1979: Charles Wallace
1979–1984: Derrick Mellor
1984–1986: Bernard Coleman
1986–1989: John MacDonald
1989–1991: Terence Steggle
1991–1995: Michael Dibben
1995–1998: Graham Pirnie
1998–2001: Andrew George
2001–2005: Anthony Cantor
2005–2008: John Hughes (non-resident)
2008–2012: Shan Morgan (non-resident)
2012–2013: John Freeman (non-resident)
2013–2017: Jeremy Hobbs
2017–2020: Matthew Hedges

2020–: Ramin Navai

References

External links
UK and Paraguay, gov.uk

Paraguay
 
United Kingdom Ambassadors